Nanaimo was a federal electoral district in British Columbia, Canada,  that was represented in the House of Commons of Canada from 1904 to 1979.

This riding was created as Nanaimo riding in 1903 from parts of Vancouver and Victoria ridings.

Its legal description when it was created was: "The electoral district of Nanaimo, comprising the provincial electoral districts of Cowichan, Esquimalt, Nanaimo City, Newcastle, Saanich and The Islands."

Nanaimo electoral district was renamed Nanaimo—Cowichan—The Islands in 1962.

Members of Parliament

Election results

See also 

 List of Canadian federal electoral districts
 Past Canadian electoral districts

External links

Riding history from the Library of Parliament:
Nanaimo 1904-1952
Nanaimo—Cowichan—The Islands
 Website of the Parliament of Canada

Defunct British Columbia federal electoral districts on Vancouver Island